Edward Thomas Jones (born 25 October 2001) is a Welsh professional footballer who plays as a left back for Altrincham.

Club career
Jones began his career with Stoke City having joined from Bury's academy. He spent part of the 2020–21 season on loan with AFC Telford United, where he made 12 appearances. Jones moved on loan to Hartlepool United in August 2021. He moved back to Stoke following the expiration of his loan deal in January 2022. Jones made six appearances in all competitions for Hartlepool United. On 4 February 2022, Jones joined National League side Altrincham on loan for the remainder of the 2021–22 season. Jones played 13 times for Altrincham as they finished in mid-table.

On 2 September 2022, Jones returned to Altrincham on a six-month loan along with Stoke team mate Dan Malone. On 10 January 2023, he joined Altrincham on a permanent deal.

International career
Jones is a Wales youth international, playing for them at under-17 and under-21 levels.

Career statistics

References

2001 births
Living people
Welsh footballers
Wales youth international footballers
Wales under-21 international footballers
Stoke City F.C. players
AFC Telford United players
Hartlepool United F.C. players
Altrincham F.C. players
English Football League players
Association football fullbacks
National League (English football) players